Francis Augustus Nelson, Jr. (January 24, 1910 – March 9, 1973) was an American ice hockey player who competed in the 1932 Winter Olympics.

He was born in New York City, New York and died in Montclair, New Jersey.

In 1932 he was a member of the American ice hockey team, which won the silver medal. He played five matches and scored one goal.

References

External links

1910 births
1973 deaths
American men's ice hockey forwards
Ice hockey players from New York (state)
Ice hockey players at the 1932 Winter Olympics
Medalists at the 1932 Winter Olympics
Olympic silver medalists for the United States in ice hockey
Sportspeople from New York City
Yale University alumni